Barnum Peak is a peak,  high, surmounting the east end of a prominent snow-covered rock divide near the head of Liv Glacier, just south of the mouth of LaVergne Glacier. It was discovered by Rear Admiral Byrd on the Byrd Antarctic Expedition flight to the South Pole in November 1929, and named by him for J.D. Barnum, publisher of the Syracuse Post-Standard and contributor to the expedition.

References
 

Mountains of the Ross Dependency
Dufek Coast